WRJR (670 AM) is an adult album alternative formatted broadcast radio station licensed to Claremont, Virginia, serving Hampton Roads.  WRJR is owned by Stu-Comm, Inc.

670 AM is a United States clear-channel frequency on which WSCR in Chicago, Illinois and KDLG in Dillingham, Alaska share Class A status.  WRJR must reduce power from sunset to sunrise to prevent interference to the nighttime skywave signals of the Class A stations.

WRJR and W273DZ are full-time repeater stations of WNRN.

Transmission
WRJR's tower is located near Surry, Virginia, which allows the station's daytime signal to cover all of Hampton Roads, but with its extremely low nighttime power, the station essentially broadcasts to only Surry proper at night.

670 AM is United States clear-channel frequency on which WSCR in Chicago, Illinois is the dominant Class A station.  WRJR reduces nighttime power to avoid interfering with WSCR's nighttime skywave signal.

References

External links

RJR
Radio stations established in 1989